Geoffrey de Neville (died 1193) was the 2nd feudal baron of Ashby in Lincolnshire.

Origins
He was the son and heir of Gilbert de Neville (d.1166/9), 1st feudal baron of Ashby, to whom King Henry II had granted the manors of Ashby and Toynton in 1162. Gilbert's lands were valued at £15 per annum and were held by military service of one knight.

Marriage and children
At some time before 1176 he married (as her second husband) Emma de Bulmer (d.1208), widow of Geoffrey de Valognes, daughter of Bertram de Bulmer (d.pre-1166) and heiress of her brother William de Bulmer (d.1176/8). Emma's father held 3 1/5 knight's fees and in the mid-twelfth century his estate was the joint largest in the "dominion of Saint Cuthbert" (i.e. County Durham). She brought to her husband several estates, including Brancepeth Castle (built by the  Bulmer family) in County Durham and Sheriff Hutton Castle (built by Bertram de Bulmer, near Bulmer, the original seat of the family), Raskelf and Sutton-in-the-Forest, all in Yorkshire. It is believed that the bull crest of the Neville family was a canting reference to their Bulmer ancestry, possibly even the crest of the Bulmer family. By Emma he had children:
Henry de Neville (d.1227), son and heir, who married a certain Alice but died childless when his sole heir became his sister Isabel.

Isabel de Neville (d.1248/54), sister and heiress of her brother, who married firstly Robert FitzMaldred (1170/4-1242/8) of Raby Castle, Staindrop in County Durham. She is believed to be represented by one of the surviving female effigies in Staindrop Church. Their children adopted her surname in lieu of their patronymic, but retained their own arms of Gules, a saltire argent, and became the great Neville family prominent in British history, the senior representative in a direct male line surviving today in the person of Christopher Nevill, 6th Marquess of Abergavenny (born 1955). She married secondly Gilbert de Brakenberg. By Robert FitzMaldred she had children including:
Geoffrey "de Neville" (d.circa 1242), eldest son and heir, who adopted his maternal surname in lieu of his patronymic and married a certain Joan. He predeceased his mother, possibly also his father, but left a son Robert de Neville (d.1282), Sheriff of Yorkshire and Sheriff of Northumberland (1258) and heir to his grandmother Isabel de Neville.

References

1193 deaths